The  is a city tram station on the Takaoka Kidō Line located in Takaoka, Toyama Prefecture, Japan. This tram stop was created in order to service the shopping area between Katahara-machi and Otaya Avenue, and to service JR West's Takaoka Station.

It was called  before the platform was relocated from the street to the first (i.e. ground) floor of the railway station building on March 29, 2014.

Name
Unlike other station names of the Manyōsen, the word "Station," which refers to the JR station, is a part of the name of the tram stop.

Structure
There are two platforms served by two tracks.

History

April 10, 1948: Toyama Chihō Railway opens Chitetsu-Takaoka Station
April 1, 1959: Station renamed Shin-Takaoka Station when the line is transferred to Kaetsunō Railway
1979: Station renamed Takaoka-Eki-mae Station
April 1, 2002: Station becomes a part of Manyosen
March 29, 2014: Station moves from the street to the current building.

Surrounding area
JR West Takaoka Station, terminus for the Jōhana and Himi Lines, is located right in front of this station.

Adjacent stations

References

Railway stations in Toyama Prefecture
Railway stations in Japan opened in 1948